Nil Solans Baldó (born 14 April 1992) is a Spanish rally driver.

Biography
Solans won the Junior World Rally Championship and WRC-3 in 2017 He also was the winner of the GSeries Andorra three years in a row (2015, 2016 and 2017), champion of the Spanish Rally Championship Gravel (CERT) in 2020 and of Catalonia in the two-wheel-drive category in 2013, winner of the Copa de España (gravel) in 2013 and runner-up in the CERT in 2014.

Solans currently races in European Rally Championship with Rally Team Spain, using a Skoda Fabia Rally2 evo.  He is set to replace injured Pierre-Louis Loubet behind the wheel of 2C Competition prepared Hyundai i20 Coupe WRC during 2021 Rally Catalunya.

He is the older brother of Jan Solans, who is also a rally driver.

Rally results

WRC results

WRC-2 results

ERC results

* Season still in progress.

Notes

References

External links  

  
 ewrc-results.com - Nil Solans

1992 births
Living people
People from Vallès Occidental
Sportspeople from the Province of Barcelona
Spanish rally drivers
Catalan rally drivers
World Rally Championship drivers